Solimonas variicoloris is a Gram-negative, rod-shaped and non-spore-forming bacterium from the genus of Solimonas which has been isolated from a hexane degrading biofilter from Hamm in Germany.

References

Bacteria described in 2008
Gammaproteobacteria